Adelphi is a settlement on the island of Saint Thomas in the United States Virgin Islands.

There are visible estate ruins in Adelphi.

References

External links

Populated places in Saint Thomas, U.S. Virgin Islands
West End, Saint Thomas, U.S. Virgin Islands